Stephen Jolly (born 1962) is an Australian politician, socialist activist, author and construction worker. He is a councillor in the City of Yarra and previously was the President and lead candidate for the Victorian Socialists during the 2018 state election.

Following allegations of family violence, Jolly was suspended from the Victorian Socialists pending an investigation, leading him to resign from the party.

Biography
Jolly was born in London to a single Irish mother who had left Ireland due to concerns regarding the predominant Catholic Church's attitude towards single parents. He was raised in Ireland by his grandparents in a public housing estate. He moved to study at the University of Cape Town in 1977. In the early 1980s, he moved to Ireland and became involved in the Militant faction of the Irish Labour Party. In 1983 he supported underground opposition to Robert Mugabe's regime in Zimbabwe.

Jolly moved to Sydney in 1985 and became involved in the Militant faction of the Australian Labor Party (later renamed to the Socialist Party), serving as Editor of its newspaper The Militant and as National Secretary until 2000. While working in construction, he has served as a shop steward with the Construction, Forestry, Mining, Maritime and Energy Union.

In 1989, at the age of 27, Jolly was a first-hand witness of the 1989 Tiananmen Square protests and massacre while he was speaking to protestors and helped them organise. Jolly was reportedly the only Westerner to address "the half-a-million strong crowd of students occupying Tiananmen Square". He noted in a 1990 news article that the protestors "never believed the People's Army would turn against them" and has since been involved in pro-democracy in China rallies.

In 1993, Jolly and Militant was involved in a year-long occupation of Richmond High School, organised to prevent the Victorian government from closing the school. In 2000, he supported and was involved in the S11 anti-globalisation protests in Melbourne. In 2011 and 2012, he pledged to support the Occupy Melbourne movement against corporate influence in politics.

Jolly's socialist political stances have led to hostile reactions from far-right groups such as the United Patriots Front, which has promoted rallies and death threats against him. In 2015, a man was charged over death and rape threats towards Jolly.

In 2016, Jolly led a mass resignation from the Socialist Party (now Socialist Action). He alleged there had been a cover-up of allegations of sexual abuse within the party,. The party denied any cover-up. Jolly and others who had left then established a new group, The Socialists. In 2018 he joined the Victorian Socialists, an electoral alliance combining the Socialist Alliance, Socialist Alternative, as well as non-party affiliated socialists.

Political career

Local government (2004–present)
In 2004 he was elected as a Councillor for The City of Yarra in the Landgridge Ward, representing the suburbs of Abbotsford, Alphington, Clifton Hill, Collingwood, Fairfield, Fitzroy and Richmond. Jolly was reportedly the first elected socialist councillor in Melbourne "since the Second World War".

In 2017, Jolly voted in favour of the controversial decision to cancel its Australia Day ceremony as a part of the Change the Date campaign. This resulted in backlash from the federal government whereby the council was stripped of its citizenship powers and the council being protested by nationalist groups.

State government campaigns

Socialist Party (1999–2016)

Jolly has attempted to contest the Victorian electoral district of Richmond as a member of the Socialist Party several times. In these elections he stood as an independent, as the party was not registered with the VEC. In the 1999 Victorian state election he gained 12.0% of the vote. They re-contested the seat in the 2002, 2006, 2010, and 2014 state elections, with lesser success. During these elections the party campaigned for policies such as free public transport, promoting the local arts scene, and anti-capitalism. Their 2010 campaign was supported by the CFMEU, ETU, and UFU, who raised $25,000 for the campaign.

Victorian Socialists (2018)

In February 2018, Jolly announced that he will be contesting a seat in the Legislative Council in the 2018 Victorian state elections as a leading candidate of the Victorian Socialists ticket. Jolly stated this campaign attempted to fight for the programs promoted by international left-wing politicians such as Jeremy Corbyn, Bernie Sanders, and Jean-Luc Mélenchon. The decision to run in the Northern Metropolitan Region has been considered controversial by Reason Party's Fiona Patten, due to the possibility of splitting the non-conservative vote in the count for the last seat. This ticket was supported by a wide variety of trade union groups, including the ETU, NUW, CFMMEU, UFU, AMIEU, and VAHPA. The ETU secretary Troy Gray justified this support over parties such as the Australian Labor Party, a traditional unionist party, by stating that Jolly was the only candidate representing "blue collar values". The campaign was also endorsed by several public figures such as Noam Chomsky, Gary Foley, and Tariq Ali.

Bibliography 

 Eyewitness in China (Melbourne: Socialist Party, 1989)

 Behind the Lines – Richmond Secondary College: a school that dared to fight (Melbourne: Global Books, 1996)

 That Which Surrounds Us: Refugees, Racism and Capitalism in Australia (Melbourne: Socialist Party, 2002)

References

External links 
 Councillor Stephen Jolly | Yarra City Council
 Official party website
 Official Twitter account

1962 births
Chinese democracy activists
1989 Tiananmen Square protests and massacre
Living people
People from Melbourne
21st-century Australian politicians
Australian builders
Victoria (Australia) local councillors
Australian socialists
Leaders of political parties in Australia
Irish emigrants to Australia
Trade unionists from Melbourne
Australian trade unionists
Irish expatriates in South Africa
Irish expatriates in the United Kingdom
University of Cape Town alumni